is a Japanese football player who plays for Berkeley Goats FC.

Club statistics
Updated to 1 January 2020.

References

External links
Profile at Montedio Yamagata

 

1984 births
Living people
Hannan University alumni
Association football people from Hyōgo Prefecture
Japanese footballers
J1 League players
J2 League players
J3 League players
Vissel Kobe players
Júbilo Iwata　players
Montedio Yamagata players
Fujieda MYFC players
Association football midfielders